Baseball in the UAAP is an all-male sport. Six teams are participating in the seniors division while there are four teams in the juniors division. Baseball was introduced as a sport in the seniors division in 1938. In the juniors division, Baseball was added as a demonstration sport in Season 74 (2011–12) as there were only three teams participating. In Season 80 (2017–18), it was elevated to a regular sport since the number of participating teams increased to four.

List of champions

Championship titles before the formation of juniors' division (1938-2011)

Championship titles after the inclusion of juniors' division (2011 onwards)

Number of championships by school

*School withdrew from the UAAP in 1962.

External links
UAAP Championship Scoreboard (List of Champions of all UAAP sports until 1998–99)

Baseball
Baseball in the Philippines